Mei Lin (1915-1997), also romanised as Mei Ling, was a Chinese actress who worked in the Chinese movie industry in the 1930s. She worked for the Lianhua Film Company, where she began her film career.  She also worked for the Xinhua Film Company. She appeared on the cover of the January 1936 issue of The Young Companion pictorial, also known as Liangyou, issue number 113.

Movies

Linhua film company
The Innocent Gentleman (无愁君子), leading actress
Song of China (天伦), supporting actress
Lianhua Symphony (联华交响曲), supporting actress

Xinhua film company
 Flying Blessing (飞来福), leading actress
 Children's Heroes (儿女英雄传), leading actress

References

20th-century Chinese actresses
1915 births
1997 deaths
Chinese film actresses
Chinese silent film actresses